Sang-e Rizeh or Sang Rizeh may refer to:
 Sang Rizeh, Mazandaran
 Bala Sang Rizeh, Mazandaran Province
 Pain Sang Rizeh, Mazandaran Province